UFC on ESPN: Ngannou vs. Velasquez (also known as UFC on ESPN 1) was a mixed martial arts event produced by the Ultimate Fighting Championship that was held on February 17, 2019 at Talking Stick Resort Arena, now known as Footprint Center in Phoenix, Arizona, United States.

Background
A heavyweight bout between former two-time UFC Heavyweight Champion Cain Velasquez and former title challenger Francis Ngannou served as the event headliner. This is Cain Velasquez's final match before moving to the WWE.

As a result of the cancellation of UFC 233, fights between Cortney Casey and Cynthia Calvillo, James Vick and Paul Felder, Benito Lopez and Manny Bermudez and Aleksandra Albu and Emily Whitmire respectively, were rescheduled for this event.

A women's flyweight bout between former Invicta FC Bantamweight Champion Lauren Murphy and Ashlee Evans-Smith was expected to take place at the event. However, on December 19, Murphy announced she will need more time off to recover from surgery and won't make it to this event. On December 20, it was reported that Andrea Lee would replace Murphy against Evans-Smith.

At the weigh-ins, former UFC Bantamweight Champion Renan Barão, Manny Bermudez and former Invicta FC Atomweight Champion Jessica Penne missed the required weight for their respective fights. Barão weighted at 138 pounds and Bermudez weighted at 140 pounds, 2 pounds and 4 pounds over the bantamweight non-title fight limit of 136 respectively. Meanwhile, Penne weighed in at 118 pounds, 2 pounds over the strawweight non-title fight limit of 116. All three bouts were set to continue at catchweight. Barão and Penne were fined 20% of their purse and Bermudez was fined 30% of his purse which went to their opponents.

In turn, Penne pulled out of her bout against Jodie Esquibel, as she severely sprained her ankle while warming up the morning of the event. The bout was subsequently scrapped.

Results

Bonus awards
The following fighters were awarded $50,000 bonuses:
Fight of the Night:  Vicente Luque vs. Bryan Barberena
Performance of the Night: Kron Gracie and Luke Sanders

Reported payout
The following is the reported payout to the fighters as reported by the Arizona Department of Gaming. It does not include sponsor money and also does not include the UFC's traditional "fight night" bonuses. The total disclosed payout for the event was $1,871,000.

 Francis Ngannou: $220,000 (includes $110,000 win bonus) def. Cain Velasquez: $450,000
 Paul Felder: $92,000 (includes $46,000 win bonus) def. James Vick: $65,000
 Cynthia Calvillo: $88,000 (includes $44,000 win bonus) def. Cortney Casey: $50,000
 Kron Gracie: $52,000 (includes $27,000) def. Alex Caceres: $55,000
 Vicente Luque: $82,000 (includes $41,000 win bonus) def. Bryan Barberena: $35,000
 Andre Fili: $74,000 (includes $37,000 win bonus) def. Myles Jury: $36,000
 Aljamain Sterling: $140,000 (includes $70,000 win bonus) def. Jimmie Rivera: $68,000
 Manny Bermudez: $28,000 (includes $14,000 win bonus) def. Benito Lopez: $12,000
 Andrea Lee: $28,000 (includes $14,000 win bonus) def. Ashlee Evans-Smith: $30,000
 Nik Lentz: $106,000 (includes $53,000 win bonus) def. Scott Holtzman: $33,000
 Luke Sanders: $38,000 (includes $19,000 win bonus) def. Renan Barão: $53,000
 Emily Whitmire: $24,000 (includes $12,000 win bonus) def. Aleksandra Albu: $12,000

See also 

 List of UFC events
 2019 in UFC
 List of current UFC fighters

References 

UFC on ESPN
2019 in mixed martial arts
Events in Phoenix, Arizona
Mixed martial arts in Arizona
Sports competitions in Phoenix, Arizona
2019 in sports in Arizona
February 2019 sports events in the United States